Staatskapelle is a denomination used by several German symphony and theatre orchestras. In the alphabetical order of their hometowns, they are:

Staatskapelle Berlin
Sächsische Staatskapelle Dresden
Staatskapelle Halle
Badische Staatskapelle (Karlsruhe)
Mecklenburgische Staatskapelle (Schwerin)
Staatskapelle Weimar.

See also
Court chapel (disambiguation)